The Men's 200m Individual Medley (IM) event at the 2007 Pan American Games occurred at the Maria Lenk Aquatic Park in Rio de Janeiro, Brazil, with the final being swum on July 20.

At this race, Bradley Ally won the first medal of his country in swimming at Pan American Games at all times.

Medalists

Results

Finals

Preliminaries

References
For the Record, Swimming World Magazine, September 2007 (p. 48+49)

Medley, Men's 200